Bad Bad (also Romanized as Bād Bād and Bādbād) is a village in Borborud-e Sharqi Rural District, in the Central District of Aligudarz County, Lorestan Province, Iran. At the 2006 census, its population was 350, in 72 families.

References 

Towns and villages in Aligudarz County